The Ennead or Great Ennead was a group of nine deities in Egyptian mythology worshipped at Heliopolis: the sun god Atum; his children Shu and Tefnut; their children Geb and Nut; and their children Osiris, Isis, Set, and Nephthys. The Ennead sometimes includes Horus the Elder, an ancient form of the falcon god, not the son of Osiris and Isis.

Status within ancient Egypt
The Great Ennead was only one of several such groupings of nine deities in ancient Egypt. Its claims to preeminence by its Heliopolitan priests were not respected throughout Egypt. As close as Memphis (also within modern Cairo), the priests of Ptah celebrated him as superior to the Nine.

In addition to Memphis having its own creation myth, the Ogdoad (of the city of Hermopolis) centered around physical creation and eight primordial gods was another creation story that existed at the same time.

Name in Egyptian, Greek, and Latin

The English name ennead is a borrowing via Latin of the Greek name enneás, meaning "the nine". The term was a calque of the Egyptian name, written  and also meaning "the Nine". Egyptologists conventionally transcribe it as Pesedjet.

History
The ancient Egyptians created several enneads as their unification under  brought numerous local cults into contact with one another. The ancient Egyptian mythology often had many different explanations for the same phenomenon. This concept is especially unique because no single story was more accurate than another, but rather the truth was a mix of them all. The Pyramid Texts of Dynasties V and VI mention the "Great Ennead", the "Lesser Ennead", the "Dual Ennead", and the "Seven Enneads". Some pharaohs established enneads that incorporated themselves as gods. The ennead mentioned in the Egyptian calendar of lucky and unlucky days, may reference the Pleiades.

The most important was the "Great" or "Heliopolitan Ennead" of Awanu, known under the Greeks and Romans as Heliopolis. It celebrated the family of the sun god Atum (sometimes referred to as Atum-Re) and thrived from the Old Kingdom to the Ptolemaic period.

Its development remains uncertain, although it appears to have first appeared when Ra's cult – supreme under  – declined in importance under . Egyptologists have traditionally theorized that the Heliopolitan priesthood established it to establish the preeminence of Atum over the others, incorporating some major gods in lesser positions and omitting others entirely. The most prominent of such deities was Osiris, god of vegetation and the afterlife, who was incorporated into the ennead as Atum's great-grandson. However, in the 20th century, some Egyptologists question the whole scenario. After the Great Ennead was well established, the cult of Ra – identified with Atum – recovered much of its importance until superseded by the cult of Horus. The two were then combined as Ra-Horus of the Horizons.

Mythology

According to the creation story of the Heliopolitan priests, the world originally consisted of the primordial waters of precreation personified as Nun. From it arose a mound on the First Occasion. Upon the mound sat the self-begotten god Atum, who was equated with the sun god Ra. Atum evolved from Nun through self-creation. Atum either spat or masturbated, producing air personified as Shu and moisture personified as Tefnut. The siblings Shu and Tefnut mated to produce the earth personified as Geb and the nighttime sky personified as Nut.

Geb and Nut were the parents of Osiris and Isis and of Set and Nephthys, who became respective couples in turn. Osiris and Isis represent fertility and order, while Set and Nephthys represent chaos to balance out Osiris and Isis. Horus, the son of Osiris and Isis, is often included in this creation tradition. Due to the duality of Ancient Egyptian myths, this is only one of many creation stories. The Egyptians believed no specific myth was more correct than the other, rather that some combination of these myths was correct. This creation story, the Heliopolitan tradition, is one of physiological creation. The other major creation traditions are the Memphite Theology and Hermopolitian Ogdoad creation myth.

Gallery

Variant hieroglyphs for the Ennead
{|
|-
| N6:D46-R8-R8-R8-G7-Z3
|      
| N9*X1:Z2-R8
|      
| N6:X1-R8-R8-R8-A40-Z3
|-
|colspan=5| 
|-
| N6:X1*Z4-R8-R8-R8-G7-Z3
|      
| N9:X1-R8-Z3
|      
| N6-X1-R8-R8-R8
|-
|colspan=5| 
|-
| N9:X1-R8-R8-R8-A40-Z3
|      
| N9:X1-A40:Z2
|      
| N9:X1-R8-R8-R8-G7
|-
|colspan=5| 
|-
| N9:X1-R8-R8-R8
|      
| N9:Y1-R8A
|      
| N10:Y1-R8A-G7-Z3A
|-
|colspan=5| 
|-
| R8*R8*R8:R8*R8*R8:R8*R8*R8
|      
|      
|colspan=2| N9:Y1-R8A-R8A-R8A
|}

{|
| N9:Z3A*Z3A*Z3A-R8A-R8A-R8A (properly Z16H)
|      
|      
| F37:X1-Z2:Z2:Z2-R8-R8-R8 (properly F37J, a variant with a plain line at a 45° angle)
|}

A dual Ennead was written
R8A-R8A-R8A-R8A-R8A-R8A

References

Bibliography

  
 

Groups of Egyptian deities
Egyptian mythology
Creation myths
Cultural lists

ca:Llista de personatges de la mitologia egípcia#E